Sabina (born 20 April 1961) is an Indian judge. Presently, she is the Acting Chief Justice of Himachal Pradesh High Court and a former Judge of the Rajasthan High Court and the Punjab and Haryana High Court.

References 

Indian judges

1961 births
Living people